Kingdom Breweries is a Cambodian craft beer brewery company that was founded in 2009. It is the largest craft brewery in Southeast Asia, serving as a backend production hub for over 30 craft brewers in Thailand, Hong Kong, Singapore and the Philippines. It is located in Phnom Penh, Cambodia, along the banks of the Tonlé Sap river on the north end of the city, and is housed in a renovated factory formerly occupied by Nestlé.

The company is co-owned by Leopard Cambodia Fund, Cambodia's first private equity fund operated by frontier markets private equity firm Leopard Capital, and Charles Street International Holdings.

Kingdom launched its first beer, Clouded Leopard Pilsener, in September 2010, which was awarded a Belgian Monde Selection Gold Quality Award in 2011.

Products
Currently, Kingdom offers four types of beer: 
 Kingdom Pilsener – a traditional pilsener (5% alc/vol)
 Kingdom IPA – a hoppy, amber-colored beer (5.8% alc/vol)
 Kingdom Mango IPA – a full-bodied IPA with a hint of mango (5.8% alc/vol)
 Kingdom White – a Belgian-style wheat beer (5% alc/vol)

The Taproom

The brewery has an onsite bar and lounge known as the Taproom, where visitors have an opportunity to sample the brewery's variety of beers and take guided tours of the facility. Unscheduled tours of the brewery are held Monday through Saturday between 1 p.m. and 5 p.m., and groups of five or more can schedule tours by appointment.

TGIF – Thank God It's Friday

On the first Friday of every month, the Taproom hosts a special "TGIF" event, offering a burger, fries and all-you-can-drink draft beer from Kingdom Breweries and Indochine Beer, another Cambodia-based craft brewery, for $15 (USD). The event lasts from 6 p.m. to 11 p.m.

References

Beer in Cambodia
Privately held companies of Cambodia
Companies of Cambodia
Cambodian brands
Food and drink companies established in 2009
Food and drink companies of Cambodia
Cambodian companies established in 2009
Companies based in Phnom Penh